Yeswanthanagar  is a village in the southern state of Karnataka, India. It is located in the Sandur taluk of Bellary district in Karnataka.

Demographics
 India census, Yeswanthanagar had a population of 5157 with 2685 males and 2472 females.

The village is growing very fast because of the huge availability of the Iron and Manganese ore.

The places to be seen here are:
 Gandi Narasimha swamy temple: nice location for a day picnic where Narasimha swamy temple is place in the valley of hills and in the banks of Narihalla, which cuts the hill.
 Sandur polytechnic college is placed here which is very good and famous college for it excellent education.

See also
 Bellary
 Districts of Karnataka

References

External links
 http://Bellary.nic.in/

Villages in Bellary district